Robin Simon (born 12 July 1956) is a British guitarist who was a member of Ultravox, Magazine and Visage.

Biography

Early career
Robin Simon played guitar in a number of local Halifax based bands in the early to mid-1970s. The bands included the Halifax Collective, which featured a number of teenage musicians, writers and performers, including Jan Cyrka, Andy Jones, Chris Marshall, Robs brother Paul and future Ultravox member Billy Currie. He moved to London in 1975 and later joined the punk pop band Ians Radio (later called Neo) in 1976. Neo were one of the bands on the early London punk live scene. They featured on the Live at the Vortex album and supported Ultravox several times at the Marquee club in London, before Simon was offered the guitarist position in Ultravox.

Ultravox
Simon joined Ultravox, replacing Stevie Shears, in 1977, bringing a more multi-dimensional sound to the band. This was due to his pioneering use of a guitar multi effects pedals sound, including a guitar monitor amplifier with tremolo effect. Timed echo, on the song Slow Motion, plus Chorus, Flanger, fuzz, wah-wah, delay and compressor pedals created a guitar sound unique at that time.  He co-wrote the  single "Slow Motion" from their 1978 third album, Systems of Romance, the original Ultravox line-up's only official hit.

In addition to playing all guitars on Systems of Romance, Simon co-produced it with the band, Conny Plank (of Kraftwerk fame) and Dave Hutchins. He also pioneered the use of synthesizers that were put through guitar effects pedals, prior to Gary Numan's echoing of the technique, notably on the track "Quiet Men".

In early 1979, after the US tour with the band and no longer on Island Records, having been dropped by the label despite increased sales and positive reviews, John Foxx left Ultravox. Simon left some months later. He felt that without John Foxx, who had founded and named the band, and was its main songwriter, a new singer could cause the band to lose its integrity.

While on the USA tour, Simon met Grace Weisbard, and returned to New York three months later to marry her on 25 April 1979. He lived in Coney Island, New York, for a year, and jammed with, among others, a local electro post-punk band called The Futants (along with Defunkt keyboardist Martin Fischer). Grace Simon (née Weisbard) moved to England with him, during his time with Magazine, before returning to New York.

Magazine
After returning to the United Kingdom, Simon joined Magazine in 1980, replacing John McGeoch. After Magazine's tour of the United States and Australia/New Zealand plus a later live appearance with them in the movie Urgh!

He played on the song "Saddest Quay", from Magazine keyboards player Dave Formula's solo album, Satellite Sweetheart, in 2009.

John Foxx
Simon contributed to Foxx's solo albums The Garden (1981), The Golden Section (1983), and In Mysterious Ways (1985). He also performed on stage during his 1983 tour and at a special John Foxx & the Maths show at London's Roundhouse in 2010. He later became an effective member of John Foxx and the Maths with his contribution to the album group Howl, released in 2020.

Humania
Ultravox had gone on to greater success with Midge Ure fronting the band, but when Ure left the band in 1988, Billy Currie formed a new band which later included Simon. Using the early name of Uvox at rehearsal stage, they later used the name Humania. Live gigs at London's Marquee club and the borderline followed, though the band was short-lived with Currie subsequently forming another incarnation of Ultravox without Simon.

Discography
Neo
 Live at the Vortex (1977) (compilation of various artists)

Ultravox
 Systems of Romance (1978)

Magazine
 Play (1980)

John Foxx
 The Garden (1981)
 The Golden Section (1983)
 In Mysterious Ways (1985)
 The Golden Section Tour + Omnidelic Exotour (2001) (only the first CD)
John Foxx and the Maths
 Howl (2020)
Humania
 Sinews of the Soul (2006)

Ajanta Music
 And Now We Dream (2006)

Visage
 Hearts and Knives (2013)
 Demons to Diamonds (2015)

References

The Rolling Stone Encyclopedia of Rock and Roll – 3rd Edition

External links
Robin Simon at shotbybothsides.com – Unofficial Magazine website
AjantaMusic official website
http://www.mp3.com/artist/ultravox/summary/
http://www.last.fm/music/Ultravox/+wiki
https://web.archive.org/web/20110519001027/http://music.msn.com/music/artist-biography/ultravox/?silentchk=1&

English rock guitarists
Living people
Magazine (band) members
Ultravox members
People from Halifax, West Yorkshire
1956 births
English new wave musicians
John Foxx and the Maths members
Visage (band) members